Anna-Lena Terése Bergelin, previously Brundin, born Bergelin (12 April 1959) is a Swedish writer, comedian, singer and actress.

Bergelin's father was a peddler and her mother was a retired washer from Lund. She studied to become a mime and singer.

She is best known for her role in the SVT Julkalender Mysteriet på Greveholm show in 1996.

References

External links 

Living people
Swedish women comedians
Swedish women singers
Swedish television actresses
20th-century Swedish actresses
21st-century Swedish actresses
1959 births
20th-century Swedish writers
20th-century Swedish women writers
20th-century Swedish comedians
21st-century Swedish comedians